Michal Smejkal (born 21 February 1986) is a former Czech footballer. He played for FC Viktoria Plzeň, FK Teplice, FK Mladá Boleslav, SK Slavia Prague, Okzhetpes and Dukla Prague.

Career
In March 2015, Smejkal signed for Kazakhstan Premier League side FC Okzhetpes. He joined Dukla Prague in January 2016, signing a contract until the end of the 2016–17 season.

References

External links
 Official website 
 
 
 

1986 births
Living people
Czech footballers
Czech Republic youth international footballers
Czech Republic under-21 international footballers
FC Viktoria Plzeň players
FK Teplice players
FK Mladá Boleslav players
SK Slavia Prague players
Association football defenders
FK Dukla Prague players
Association football forwards
Sportspeople from Plzeň